R555 road may refer to:
 R555 road (Ireland)
 R555 road (South Africa)